Pantos may refer to:

Pantomimes, musical comedy stage productions, developed in England and mostly performed during Christmas and New Year season
American pantomimes, theatre entertainments, derived from the distinctly English entertainment genre
Pantos Logistics, a company based in South Korea

People with the surname
Anastasios Pantos (born 1976), Greek footballer
Stamatis Pantos (born 1990), Cypriot footballer

See also
Panto (disambiguation)